The World Affairs Council of Seattle is a non-profit, non-partisan international affairs organization based in Seattle, Washington. Founded in 1951, it is one of four World Affairs Councils in Washington State and a member of the World Affairs Councils of America.

The World Affairs Council links Greater Seattle to the world, providing opportunities for everyone in Greater Seattle to be a global citizen by advancing a deep understanding of international events and culture. As a hub for all things international, the World Affairs Council creates programs and opportunities for local people to interact directly with leaders, educators, and professionals from around the world. The World Affairs Council values global citizenship and cultural exchange for everyone and strives to enrich Greater Seattle's civic and cultural conversation with world perspectives through programs that:

•Allow for one-on-one conversations with government, business, and civic leaders from other nations

•Provide professional and social connections with others who share a passion for world affairs

•Educate and empower the next generation of global leaders.

Programs
The Council presents over 70 Community Programs each year, featuring leaders in politics, business, academics, and the arts. These events consist of lectures, discussion fora, and symposia aimed at strengthening the links between the greater Puget Sound area and the global community.

In addition to bringing speakers closer to the Seattle public, the World Affairs Council of Seattle runs an International Visitors Program which works in partnership with the United States Department of State to implement the International Visitor Leadership Program, a professional exchange program for emerging leaders from foreign countries. Participants are nominated by their U.S. Embassies and selected by the Bureau of Educational and Cultural Affairs, and spend 3–5 weeks in the United States meeting with their peers, engaging informally with American families, and experiencing American culture.

The Seattle World Affairs Council also conducts a program aimed at educators called Global Classroom, which develops more than 20 programs annually for teachers to better incorporate international understanding into the classrooms of high schools and junior highs throughout the Pacific Northwest region.

A subset of the World Affairs Council of Seattle is the Young Professionals International Network (YPIN), which brings together internationally minded Seattleites in their 20s and 30s for networking events, social gatherings, language groups, and more.

Affiliate councils in other cities in Washington State
World Affairs Council Tacoma 
World Affairs Council of Spokane
Olympia World Affairs Council

References

Non-profit organizations based in Seattle
World Affairs Councils